Jiao Zhimin (Chinese: 焦志敏; born December 1, 1963) is a Chinese-born naturalised-Korean  former table tennis player. She won a bronze medal in women's singles and a silver medal in women's doubles at the 1988 Seoul Olympic Games. She was a semi-finalist in women's singles and doubles at the 1985 World Championships in Gothenburg. At the 1987 World Championships in New Delhi she was runner-up in the mixed doubles, and was a member of China's victorious team.

Personal life
In 1984, she met South Korean table tennis player Ahn Jae-hyung at the 1984 Asian Table Tennis Championships in Islamabad, Pakistan. She and Ahn married in 1989 in Sweden due to the lack of diplomatic relations between China and South Korea at that time. Their marriage generated a massive hype within the South Korean media. The couple's son, golfer An Byeong-hun, became the youngest champion in United States Amateur Championship history, winning the 2009 event at the age of 17. In recent years Jiao has hosted a talk show on China's CCTV-5 television sports channel.

References

Living people
1963 births
Naturalized citizens of South Korea
Chinese female table tennis players
Olympic silver medalists for China
Olympic bronze medalists for China
Olympic medalists in table tennis
Asian Games medalists in table tennis
Table tennis players at the 1986 Asian Games
Medalists at the 1986 Asian Games
Asian Games gold medalists for China
Asian Games silver medalists for China
Chinese emigrants to South Korea
Medalists at the 1988 Summer Olympics
People from Yichun, Heilongjiang
Table tennis players from Heilongjiang
Naturalised table tennis players
Olympic table tennis players of China
World Table Tennis Championships medalists
Table tennis players at the 1988 Summer Olympics